John Portineus Greene (September 3, 1793 – September 20, 1844) was an early leader in the Latter Day Saint movement.

Greene was born in Herkimer, New York. He was a Methodist minister at Mendon, New York.  He was friends with Heber C. Kimball and they claimed to witness "signs in the heavens" on September 22, 1827.  He later met Latter Day Saint missionary Samuel Harrison Smith, who sold Greene a copy of the Book of Mormon. Greene joined the Latter Day Saint church in April 1832, as did the family of his wife Rhoda, which included Brigham Young.

Greene would serve a total of 11 missions for the church. In May 1834, Greene baptized three people while serving as a missionary in Villanova in Chautauqua County, New York.  He was the original president of the Eastern States Mission in May 1839.  He published a pamphlet about the 1838 expulsion of the members of The Church of Jesus Christ of Latter-day Saints from Missouri in 1839 entitled Facts Relative to the Expulsion of the Mormons or Latter-Day Saints from the State of Missouri, Under the Extermination Order. This was one of the first significant historical works published by a member of the Church.

In 1844, Greene was the chief of police in Nauvoo, Illinois, who supervised the destruction of the press of the Nauvoo Expositor. When Joseph Smith and his brother Hyrum submitted to incarceration in Carthage, Greene was part of a group of men that accompanied them to the Carthage Jail.

After the Smiths were killed, Greene supported the succession claims of James Strang, but Greene died amid the succession crisis. The Church of Jesus Christ of Latter Day Saints (Strangite) alleges that Greene was "martyred by poison ... for disclosing that James Strang was appointed by Joseph Smith."

Notes

References
 Encyclopedia of Latter-day Saint Church History, pp. 445–46.

1793 births
1844 deaths
19th-century Mormon missionaries
American Mormon missionaries in the United States
Converts to Mormonism from Methodism
Latter Day Saints from Illinois
Latter Day Saints from New York (state)
Leaders in the Church of Christ (Latter Day Saints)
Methodist ministers
Mission presidents (LDS Church)
Religious leaders from New York (state)